12th SDFCS Awards
December 18, 2007

Best Film: 
No Country for Old Men

Best Director: 
Paul Thomas Anderson
There Will Be Blood
The 12th San Diego Film Critics Society Awards were announced on December 18, 2007.

Winners
Best Actor: 
Daniel Day-Lewis – There Will Be Blood
Best Actress: 
Julie Christie – Away from Her
Best Animated Film:
Ratatouille
Best Cast:
No Country for Old Men
Best Cinematography: 
No Country for Old Men – Roger Deakins
Best Director:
Paul Thomas Anderson – There Will Be Blood
Best Documentary Film (tie): 
Crazy Love
Deep Water
Best Editing: 
Atonement – Paul Tothill
Best Film:
 No Country for Old Men 
Best Foreign Language Film: 
The Diving Bell and the Butterfly (Le scaphandre et le papillon) • France/United States
Best Production Design: 
Sweeney Todd: The Demon Barber of Fleet Street – Dante Ferretti
Best Score: 
"There Will Be Blood" – Jonny Greenwood
Best Screenplay – Adapted: 
There Will Be Blood – Paul Thomas Anderson
Best Screenplay – Original:
Juno – Diablo Cody
Best Supporting Actor: 
Tommy Lee Jones – No Country for Old Men
Best Supporting Actress: 
Amy Ryan – Gone Baby Gone

2
2007 film awards
2007 in American cinema